Cochrane District is a district and census division in Northeastern Ontario in the Canadian province of Ontario. It was created in 1921 from parts of Timiskaming and Thunder Bay districts.

In 2016, the population was 79,682. The district seat is Cochrane.

Bennet Lake Esker Kame Complex Conservation Reserve is located in Cochrane District.

Subdivisions

City

Towns

Townships

Cree Nation reserves
Abitibi Indian Reserve No. 70 (Wahgoshig First Nation)
Constance Lake 92 (Constance Lake First Nation)
Factory Island 1 (Moose Cree First Nation)
Flying Post 73 (Flying Post First Nation)
Fort Albany 67 (Fort Albany First Nation)
Moose Factory 68 (Moose Cree First Nation)
New Post 69 (Taykwa Tagamou Nation)
New Post 69A (Taykwa Tagamou Nation)

Unorganized areas
North Part (includes the local services boards of Hallébourg, Jogues, Lac-Sainte-Thérèse, and Moose Factory)
South East Part
South West Part

Geographic Townships
This list is incomplete.
Ben Nevis
Gardiner

Demographics

See also
List of townships in Ontario
List of secondary schools in Ontario#Cochrane District

References

External links